Virginia Andreescu Haret (1894–1962) was a Romanian architect and is credited as the first woman to graduate with a degree in architecture in Romania. She is also the first woman to reach the rank of Romanian Architectural Inspector General.

Biography
Maria Virginia Andreescu was born on 21 June 1894 in Bucharest, Romania, and was the niece of the painter Ion Andreescu. Her mother died when she was nine years old and Andreescu took charge at that point for raising her three younger siblings. In 1912, she graduated from high school at the Liceul Mihai Viteazul (Lyceum Michael the Brave). She enrolled in the 
Superior School of Architecture and was the first woman to graduate with a degree in architecture in 1919,  having earned the highest distinction award "very good". Simultaneously with her studies for a degree in architecture, Andreescu was attending the Academy of Fine Arts, studying under Ipolit Strâmbu. In 1920, Strâmbu organized a showing of 66 of Andreescu's works including drawings, sketches, and watercolors. They were well received and Historical Monuments Commission bought 28 of them for permanent display.

In 1922, she undertook a study trip of the architecture of the Kingdom of Serbs, Croats and Slovenes and returned with a report, which was published in Fine Arts. Using the money she had gotten from the sale of her works to the Monuments Commission, Andreescu then went to Italy to further her education in Rome.  She studied for a year and a half with Professor Gr. Bargelini, also working with archaeologists to understand traditional building methods. The Novecento Italiano movement, which was popular at that time, can be seen as an influence in her later works. After completing her studies in Rome, Andreescu returned to Romania in the second half of 1923 and began working at the Ministry of  Technical Education, where she worked until her retirement in 1947. In 1928 she married Spiru I. Haret, (1892-1970), nephew of the engineer and mathematician Spiru C. Haret. The couple had one child, Radu, who became an engineer.

Her most prolific period of building occurred between the World Wars. She built many projects including the Gheorghe Şincai High School (1924-1928), a wing of the Cantemir Vodă National College (1926-1929), the Govora Casino (1928-1929), as well as many private homes monuments and public and private buildings. Her style varies encompassing all of the Romanian architectural styles from classical to modern which were present in the early 20th century. Her own home was built in the Art Deco style, for which she seemed to have a personal preference. After having built some 40 buildings, she received the designation as Romanian Architectural Inspector General, the first woman to have served in this capacity. She represented her country at many conferences and Congresses, including the International Architecture Congresses, in Brussels, Moscow, Paris and Rome, and she received many awards for her designs. In addition to building, she wrote a history of architecture with Nicolae Ghica-Budești in four volumes, complete with watercolors.

Haret died on 6 May 1962 in Bucharest.

Works 
 1923, Nicu Stănescu Villa, #43 Strada Paris
 1923, Dionisie Germani Villa, #45 Strada Paris
 1923-1927, Palace for the Tinerimea Română Society, #19 Strada Johann Guttenberg
 1924-1928, Gheorghe Șincai High School
 1924-1928 Apartment, #50-56 Strada Frumoasă
 1924, Gongopol Building, #40 Strada Icoanei 
 192?, I. Catuniari Villa, #30 Strada Washington
 1925, Papiniu Villas, #54 and #56 Strada Roma
 1925, Dimitrie Cantemir High School, #117 Bulevardul Dacia
 1926, P.Leibovici Villa, #5 Intrarea Spătarului
 1926, Spiru Haret-Gold Villa, #8 Intrarea Spătarului
 1926, Locuinţe Ieftine Company Building, #1 Bulevardul Hristo Botev
 1926-1929, wing of Cantemir Vodă National College
 1927, Ziarul Universul Villa, #5 Strada Madrid
 1927-1934, Biserica Sfânta Treime Ghencea Church, jointly with Jean Pompilian
 1927, Anthropology Research Center for the Carol Davila Medical University, #8 Bulevardul Eroli Sanitari
 1928-1929, Govora Casino
 1928, Col. Cezar Goliel Villa, #16 Strada Dr. Mihail Obedenaru
 1928, Ianculescu (Rosetti) Villa, #1-3 Strada Povernei
 1928, Wine Warehouse and living quarters for Banca Viticolă, #17-21 Strada Petru Rareș
 1928, Augustin Opran Villa, #15 Strada Alexandru Philippide
 1929, Dr. Nicolae Gheorghe Lupu Villa, #41 Bulevardul Dacia
 1929, Seven Villas for the clerks of the Casa de Depuneri și Consemanațiuni, #2-10 Strada Theodor Burada
 1930, Steinberg Villa, #31 Strada Dr. Joseph Lister
 1930, Georgescu Villa, #41 Strada Dr. Louis Pasteur
 1930, Prof. Popsecu and Iosif Gavrea Villa, #6 & 6a Strada Mihail Obedenaru
 1931, Virginia and Spiru Haret Villa, #14 Bulevardul Lascăr Catargiu
 1932, Radu and Elena Perianu Villa, #18 Bulevardul Eroilor
 1933, Viorica and Gheorghe Rujinski Vila, #22 Strada Berzei
 1935, Nistor Villa, #17 Strada Dr. Anibal Theohari
 1935, Iuraşcu Villa, #24 Strada Emanoil Porumbaru
 1935, Panait Mazilu Villa, #76 Strada Popa Savu
 1936, Constantinescu Villa #11 Intrarea Bitolia
 1937, Dumitru Stoica Villa, #27 Strada Veronica Micle
 1942, Constanţa and Ioan G. Haret Villa, #7 Strada Jean Texier

References

Sources 

1894 births
1962 deaths
20th-century Romanian architects
Romanian women architects
Architects from Bucharest